The 1937 Boston Bees season was the 67th season of the franchise. They finished the season with 79 wins and 73 losses.

Regular season

Season standings

Record vs. opponents

Notable transactions 
 May 1, 1937: Billy Urbanski was traded by the Bees to the New York Giants for Tommy Thevenow.

Roster

Player stats

Batting

Starters by position 
Note: Pos = Position; G = Games played; AB = At bats; H = Hits; Avg. = Batting average; HR = Home runs; RBI = Runs batted in

Other batters 
Note: G = Games played; AB = At bats; H = Hits; Avg. = Batting average; HR = Home runs; RBI = Runs batted in

Pitching

Starting pitchers 
Note: G = Games pitched; IP = Innings pitched; W = Wins; L = Losses; ERA = Earned run average; SO = Strikeouts

Other pitchers 
Note: G = Games pitched; IP = Innings pitched; W = Wins; L = Losses; ERA = Earned run average; SO = Strikeouts

Relief pitchers 
Note: G = Games pitched; W = Wins; L = Losses; SV = Saves; ERA = Earned run average; SO = Strikeouts

Farm system

Notes

References 
1937 Boston Bees season at Baseball Reference

Boston Bees seasons
Boston Bees
Boston Bees
1930s in Boston